Ionel Petrov (born 7 October 1934) is a Romanian rower. He competed at the 1960 Summer Olympics in Rome with the men's coxless four where they were eliminated in the round one repêchage.

References

1934 births
Living people
Romanian male rowers
Olympic rowers of Romania
Rowers at the 1960 Summer Olympics
People from Sulina
World Rowing Championships medalists for Romania
Rowers at the 1964 Summer Olympics
European Rowing Championships medalists